The Association for Psychosocial Studies (APS) is a learned society in the United Kingdom dedicated to promoting the academic discipline of psychosocial studies. The association runs an academic journal: the Journal of Psychosocial Studies. The Association for Psychosocial Studies was formed in 2013 in order to formalise and carry forward the work of developing Psychosocial Studies in the UK. The APS emerged from the Psychosocial Studies Network, which had organised annual conferences at the major university bases for Psychosocial Studies since 2008. The APS is a charitable trust and is recognised as a Learned Society by the Academy of Social Sciences.

Founding Members
Formed in 2013, the Founding Members of the Association are: John Adlam, Phoebe Beedell, Tamara Bibby, Jo Brown, Rose Capdevila, Zoe Charalambous, Karen Ciclitira, Lita Crociani-Windland, Lynn Froggett, Stephen Frosh, Elizabeth Frost, Andy Fugard, Jason Glynos, Birgitta Haga Gripsrud, Rex Haigh, Ambrose Hogan, Paul Hoggett, Wendy Hollway, Shona Hunter, Rebecca Hutten, Luis Jiminez, David W. Jones, Warren Kinston, Helen Lucey, Jean McAvoy, James Martin, Claudia Megele, Yvonne Parry, Heather Price, Ellen Ramvi, Peter Redman, Barry Richards, Sasha Roseneil, Michael Rustin, Chris Scanlon, Gary Spencer-Humphrey, Paul Stenner, Jem Thomas, Isobel Urquhart, Julie Walsh, and Tom Wengraf.

Steering Committee
 Lynn Froggett, Chair (University of Central Lancashire)
 David W. Jones, Honorary Treasurer & Communications Officer (The Open University)
 Jacob Johanssen, Honorary Membership Secretary (St. Mary's University)
 Elizabeth Frost (University of West of England)
 Luis Jiminez (University of East London)
 Claudia Lapping (University College London)
 Chris Scanlon (Consultant Psychotherapist and Group Analyst)
 Candida Yates (Bournemouth University)
 Lita Crociani-Windland
 Nini Fang
 Anthony Faramelli

Objectives
The APS objectives are

a)     the advancement of education and research in the field of Psychosocial Studies, and publication of the results of such research,

b)     the promotion of the field of Psychosocial Studies as an academic discipline and the dissemination of knowledge concerning Psychosocial Studies,

c)     the advancement of education for the public benefit in Psychosocial Studies across different disciplines and educational sectors,

d)    to contribute to the advancement of public health and well-being, particularly in relation to mental health.

Journal of Psychosocial Studies 
According to the Journal's publication policy, their stated intent is to be "inclusive rather than exclusive", and solicit "work which pushes back - even crosses - the edges of traditional academic and practice boundaries", and such non-mainstream viewpoints are "particularly welcome".

External links

References

Learned societies of the United Kingdom
Scientific organisations based in the United Kingdom
Academic organisations based in the United Kingdom
Social sciences organizations
Professional associations based in the United Kingdom
Scholarly communication